Dag I.K. Sjøberg (born 24 January 1961) is a Norwegian computer scientist, software engineer, and politician. He is a professor of software engineering at the Department of Informatics at the University of Oslo. From 2001 to 2008 he was Research Director at Simula Research Laboratory and headed the Department of Software Engineering.

Life 
Sjøberg took his master's degree in Computer Science (cand.scient.) at the University of Oslo in 1987, and a doctorate (PhD) in Computing Science at the University of Glasgow in 1993.

In 1999, Sjøberg established the research group Industrial System Development (ISU) at the Department of Informatics at the University of Oslo. In 2002 Sjøberg was awarded The Simula Researcher of the Year Award by Managing Director Aslak Tveito. Sjøberg has also been Deputy Chair of the Urban Development, Environment and Transport Committee for The Green Party in Nordstrand since 2016.

Publications 

 D.I.K. Sjøberg, A. Johnsen and J. Solberg. Quantifying the Effect of Using Kanban versus Scrum: A Case Study. IEEE Software, 29(5):47-53, September/October 2012.
 D.I.K. Sjøberg. Confronting the Myth of Rapid Obsolescence in Computing Research, Contributed Article, Communications of the ACM 53(9):62-67, 2010.
 B.C.D. Anda, D.I.K. Sjøberg and A. Mockus. Variability and Reproducibility in Software Engineering: A Study of four Companies that Developed the same System, IEEE Transactions on Software Engineering 35(3):407-429, 2009.
 D.I.K. Sjøberg, T. Dybå and M. Jørgensen. The Future of Empirical Methods in Software Engineering Research, In: Future of Software Engineering (FOSE '07), side 358-378, IEEE-CS Press, 2007.
 E. Arisholm, H.E. Gallis, T. Dybå and D.I.K. Sjøberg. Evaluating Pair Programming with Respect to System Complexity and Programmer Expertise, IEEE Transactions on Software Engineering 33(2):65-86, 2007.
 D.I.K. Sjøberg, J.E. Hannay, O. Hansen, V.B. Kampenes, A. Karahasanovic, N.K. Liborg and A.C. Rekdal. A Survey of Controlled Experiments in Software Engineering, IEEE Transactions on Software Engineering 31(9):733-753, 2005.

References

External links 
 
 

1961 births
Living people
Academic staff of the University of Oslo
Norwegian computer scientists